Sir James Drummond Anderson KCIE (1886–1968) was Financial Commissioner of the Punjab from 1941 to 1946, and knighted in 1944.  He was the eldest son of James Drummond Anderson, D.Litt., University Lecturer in Bengali at Cambridge; and his younger brother William Louis Anderson was Anglican Bishop of firstly Portsmouth and then Salisbury.

1886 births
1968 deaths
Indian Civil Service (British India) officers
Knights Commander of the Order of the Indian Empire